On Divination in Sleep (or On Prophesying by Dreams; ; Latin: De divinatione per somnum) is a text by Aristotle in which he discusses precognitive dreams.

The treatise, one of the Parva Naturalia, is an early inquiry (perhaps the first formal one) into this phenomenon. In his skeptical consideration of such dreams, Aristotle argues that, although "the senders of such dreams should be the gods," it is nonetheless the case "that those to whom they are sent are not the best and wisest, but merely commonplace persons" (i, 462b20-22).  Thus, "Most [so-called prophetic] dreams are, however, to be classed as mere coincidences" (i, 463a31-b1).

External links
 
 English translation by J. I. Beare
 
 Greek text ed. W. D. Ross available in HTML format via Greco interattivo (Link not functioning).
 Greek text available on Greek Wikisource.

Works by Aristotle